The slender mulch-skink (Glaphyromorphus cracens)  is a species of skink found in Queensland in Australia.

References

Glaphyromorphus
Reptiles described in 1985
Taxa named by Allen Eddy Greer